Ernst Steinhauer (9 December 1925 – 8 November 2005) was a West German sprint canoer who competed in the mid to late 1950s. He won two medals at the 1954 ICF Canoe Sprint World Championships in Mâcon with a gold in the K-2 500 m and a bronze in the K-2 10000 m events.

Steinhauer competed for the United Team of Germany at the 1956 Summer Olympics in Melbourne, finishing eighth in the K-1 1000 m event.

References

Ernst Steinhauer's obituary (pg. 30) 

1925 births
2005 deaths
Canoeists at the 1956 Summer Olympics
German male canoeists
Olympic canoeists of the United Team of Germany
ICF Canoe Sprint World Championships medalists in kayak